SteelAsia Manufacturing Corp. (SAMC), also known as SteelAsia, is a Philippine steel company based in Taguig, Metro Manila which is mainly a reinforcing steel bar producer.

History
SteelAsia was established in 1965 by Benito Yao and Go Kim Pah, the latter being the founder of Equitable Banking Corporation. The company was founded as the Island Metal Manufacturing Corporation setting its first steel mill in Meycauayan with the capacity of 30,000 tons per year.

In the 1980s, Benjamin Yao took over SteelAsia's operations. It would acquire its second mill named Peninsula Steel in 1989 in Batangas. SteelAsia would establish a new steel bar mill in Bulacan in 1996 which introduced rolling mill technologies to the Philippine steel industry.

From the mid-2000s to the early 2010s, SteelAsia expanded its reinforcing bar production capacity; from producing 279,000 tons of rebar in 2006 to 1.2 million tons in 2013, securing almost half of the rebar market share in the Philippines. In 2014, it acquired two steel mills in Mindanao, which would become the only rebar manufacturing facilities in the region.

In 2019, SteelAsia is reportedly in preparation to have an initial public offering within the next two years. The company has also lobbied against the proliferation of induction furnace produced steel which it views as substandard and a detriment to the domestic steel industry. SteelAsia also started work on the Lemery Works which would be the first steel beam manufacturing facility in the Philippines upon its completion in 2023.

SteelAsia planned to build a steel mill in Plaridel, Bulacan but was met with opposition from church leaders and residents of the town due to the proximity of the facility to existing rice fields and a residential area.

The Department of Trade and Industry (DTI) in 2020 suspended SteelAsia's standard license after DTI found that the facility produced substandard steel. SteelAsia released a statement that the DTI findings only involved its Meycuayan steel mill and two specific sizes of steel bars and pledged to do corrective actions to make the facility fully compliant again.

Steel mills
SteelAsia has five operating steel mills as of 2018. These facilities are:

Under-construction
Lemery Works

Former
Island Metal – Meycauayan, Bulacan
Peninsula Steel – Batangas

References

Steel companies of the Philippines
1965 establishments in the Philippines
Companies based in Taguig